Chet Fillip (born April 4, 1957), is an American former racing driver best known for driving in the CART series. Fillip raced stock cars and a modified during his teens and early twenties at Arena Park Raceway in Lubbock, Texas. His father Marvin Fillip also raced at this track. Chet raced in the CART series in the 1982-1985 seasons, with nine career starts, and started in the Indianapolis 500 in 1982 and 1983 (the Indianapolis 500 was sanctioned by  USAC at the time, meaning that it is not counted among his CART starts).  His best CART finish was in 10th position in 1985 at Milwaukee.  At the end of the 1985 season, he switched to the NASCAR Winston Cup Series, where he continued racing through 1987, making 24 starts with a best finish of 12th.  After NASCAR, Fillip raced several years in USAC sprint cars, with eight victories including the prestigious Little 500 in 1999.

2006 saw the formation of a new racing series, the Premier Racing Association (PRA). The PRA used former pavement racing cars of the USAC Silver Crown Series which had switched to a different type of car more suitable for faster, larger tracks a mile or more in length. Fillip won the first championship of this series driving a car of his own design and manufacture. Though he won no races he finished no lower than sixth in any event while always running near the front. After at least 28 years driving everything from sports cars to Indy cars to stock cars, he won his first series championship.

With the reinstatement of the "classic" Silver Crown cars to all races on the schedule, Fillip now participates full-time in that series and won the race prior to the IndyCar Series event at Richmond International Raceway on June 28, 2008 at the age of 51. 

Fillip lives in Avon, Indiana.

Motorsports career results

American open-wheel racing
(key) (Races in bold indicate pole position)

CART PPG Indy Car World Series

Indianapolis 500

NASCAR
(key) (Bold – Pole position awarded by qualifying time. Italics – Pole position earned by points standings or practice time. * – Most laps led.)

Winston Cup Series

Daytona 500

References

1957 births
Champ Car drivers
Indianapolis 500 drivers
Living people
NASCAR drivers
People from San Angelo, Texas
Racing drivers from Texas
People from Avon, Indiana
USAC Silver Crown Series drivers